Junction Peak is a thirteener in the Sierra Nevada. Joseph Nisbet LeConte chose this name in 1896, noting that it marks the point where the Sierra Crest crosses the water divide of the Kern and Kings rivers. Today it also is the boundary between Inyo and Tulare counties, and of Kings Canyon National Park, Sequoia National Park and the John Muir Wilderness.

Botanist Edwin Bingham Copeland and partner E. N. Henderson were the first climbers known to reach Junction Peak's summit, on August 8, 1899. They pioneered the  South Ridge route, following the exposed ridge from Diamond Mesa to the top of Junction. Over the course of nearly a century, several more class 3 and 4 routes were established. The first winter climb was made by the West Ridge, culminating on March 21, 1973. The first technical climb recorded on Junction was the grade III 5.7 North Buttress route.

See also 
 Thirteener

References 

Mountains of Kings Canyon National Park
Mountains of Sequoia National Park
Mountains of the John Muir Wilderness
Mountains of Tulare County, California
Mountains of Inyo County, California
Mountains of Northern California